Hermonassa was a town of ancient Pontus on the Black Sea coast.

Its site is located near Akçaabat in Asiatic Turkey.

References

Populated places in ancient Pontus
Former populated places in Turkey
History of Trabzon Province